The Fête du Citron is a carnival event organised by the tourist office of the city of Menton, France, and held every year at the end of winter. It is also sometimes called Carnaval de Menton (Carnival of Menton).

The festival celebrates the annual production of specialty lemons and other citrus fruit in Menton. All the floats and sculptures present at the carnival are created from lemons and oranges.

The celebration takes place every year in mid-February. It has been recognised by the Ministry of Culture of France and entered in the inventory of intangible cultural heritage in 2019.

History
In 1875, hoteliers proposed to the municipality to create a carnival parade to enliven the city in winter. As early as 1876, the event attracted locals and wealthy winter visitors alike. At the time, it was fashionable for the wealthy to come and spend the winter months in the mild climate of the French Riviera. Kings, princes, and artists flocked to palaces in the city or had villas built there.
The 1882 edition of the carnival was notably attended by Queen Victoria of the United Kingdom and it culminated with a fireworks display over Garavan Bay.
The Carnival of Menton bears some similarities to its cousin from neighbouring Nice: a parade of large heads, confetti streams, flower battles, Mardi Gras celebration, and finally, the burning in effigy of the "Majesty of the Carnival". The feasts which surround the celebration mark the period before Lent.

Lemon Festival

In 1928, Menton was the main producer of lemons on the European continent. A hotelier had the idea of organizing a private exhibition of flowers and citrus fruits in the gardens of the Riviera Hotel. The event's success was such that the following year, the municipality took up the idea on its own. The name "Fête du Citron" was born in 1934. The Lemon Festival combines traditional carnival events with a celebration of Menton's reputation as Europe's lemon capital. Today, Menton is not known for the quantity of lemons it produces but rather their quality, as they are of a specialty kind sought after by chefs from across the region.
The celebration features elaborate themed floats whose structures are covered in citrus fruit, primarily lemons and oranges, a large portion of which is imported from Spain every year. At the end of the event, the fruits are sold at low prices. Each year, a different theme is chosen for the festival.

The Fête du Citron is the second largest public winter event on the French Riviera after the Nice Carnival.

The celebration did not take place during the war years between 1940 and 1946, in 1991 due to the Gulf War, and in 2021 because of the COVID-19 pandemic.

Previous themes

References

External links

 Official website
 City of Menton website

Menton
Provence-Alpes-Côte d'Azur
French culture
Festivals in France
Carnivals in France
Festivals established in 1875
Winter events in France
Intangible Cultural Heritage of Humanity